Diego Anibal Santa Cruz Cantero (born 29 October 1982) is a Paraguayan former professional footballer who played as a midfielder.

Career
In 2000, Santa Cruz played for Cerro Corá scoring 3 league goals.

In September 2003, Santa Cruz scored for Cerro Corá in a 1–0 home victory against Universal Encarnación in Paraguay's Division Intermedia.

In the 2004 season, Santa Cruz scored 5 league goals.

He has played for NK Zadar and Sportivo Luqueño.

International career
In 1999, Santa Cruz was member of the Paraguay national under-17 football team and was selected as part of the 23-man squad for the 1999 FIFA U-17 World Championship.

In 2001, Santa Cruz was part of the Paraguay national under-20 football team.

Personal life
Diego is the younger brother of the striker Roque Santa Cruz, and older brother of Julio Santa Cruz.

References

External links
 

1982 births
Paraguayan people of Spanish descent
Paraguayan footballers
Paraguayan expatriate footballers
Association football midfielders
Club Olimpia footballers
Expatriate footballers in Croatia
Sportivo Luqueño players
NK Zadar players
Living people